Maurice Jerome Litka (born 2 January 1996) is a German professional footballer who plays as a winger for Hansa Rostock.

Club career
On 29 May 2019, Preußen Münster confirmed that they had signed Litka for the 2019–20 season.

References

External links
 

1996 births
Living people
German footballers
Footballers from Hamburg
Association football midfielders
2. Bundesliga players
3. Liga players
Regionalliga players
FC St. Pauli players
FC St. Pauli II players
KFC Uerdingen 05 players
SC Preußen Münster players
FC Hansa Rostock players